Shifa College Of Medicine is a private college under Shifa Tameer-e-Millat University, established in 1998 in Islamabad. 

The college offers medical courses. Shifa Tameer-e-Millat University has a hospital named Shifa International Hospital Ltd and four colleges: Shifa College of Medicine, Shifa College of Dentistry, Shifa College of Nursing, and Shifa College of Rehabilitation.

Shifa College of Medicine's teaching hospital, Shifa International Hospitals Ltd., is one of the four hospitals of Pakistan that is accredited by Joint Commission International.

External links

References 

Private universities and colleges in Pakistan
Universities and colleges in Islamabad
Educational institutions established in 2012
2012 establishments in Pakistan
Medical colleges in Islamabad
Islamabad Capital Territory